Whittard Canyon is a submarine canyon off the coast of southwest Ireland that lies between Celtic Sea and Atlantic Ocean.

The canyon has been used as subject for numerous scientific research, ranging from its sediment transport to its biodiversity. In 2015, a group of scientists from NERC's National Oceanography Centre (NOC) on board RRS James Cook studied the canyon for five weeks. During the studies, they found abundant forms of deep-water life, such as blue sharks, swordfishes, cold-water corals, clams, and deep-sea oysters. In this canyon, the coral species can live in darkness and get their food from the passing water, which differed from the tropical corals that need sunlight to survive.

Another expedition team from NIOZ also studied that layers with high concentrations of suspended particles in the canyon, which called nepheloid layers, contribute significantly to the transport of matter that formed a good condition for the high diversity of the canyon's fauna.

See also 
 Porcupine Seabight

References

Citations

Book

Journal 
 

Submarine canyons of the Atlantic Ocean